The 1933 French Championships (now known as the French Open) was a tennis tournament that took place on the outdoor clay courts at the Stade Roland-Garros in Paris, France. The tournament ran from 25 May until 5 June. It was the 38th staging of the French Championships and the second Grand Slam tournament of the year. Jack Crawford and Margaret Scriven won the singles title.

Finals

Men's singles

 Jack Crawford (AUS) defeated  Henri Cochet (FRA) 8–6, 6–1, 6–3

Women's singles

 Margaret Scriven (GBR) defeated  Simonne Mathieu (FRA)  6–2, 4–6, 6–4

Men's doubles
 Pat Hughes /  Fred Perry defeated  Adrian Quist /  Vivian McGrath  6–2, 6–4, 2–6, 7–5

Women's doubles
 Simonne Mathieu  /  Elizabeth Ryan defeated  Sylvie Jung Henrotin /  Colette Rosambert  6–1, 6–3

Mixed doubles
 Margaret Scriven /   Jack Crawford defeated  Betty Nuthall /  Fred Perry  6–2, 6–3

References

External links
 French Open official website

French Championships
French Championships (tennis) by year
French Champ
French Championships
French Championships
French Championships (tennis)